Purshottam Lal Wahi (1928-2000) was an Indian cardiologist and the director of the department of cardiology at Post Graduate Institute of Medical Education and Research, Chandigarh. Born in Sargodha in the Punjab province of the erstwhile British India on 4 December 1928 to Bindra Ban Wahi and Devki Devi, he was an honorary fellow of the Indian Society of Cardiology and is credited with several publications on cardiology. The Government of India awarded him the fourth highest Indian civilian honour of Padma Shri in 1983.

References

External links
 

Recipients of the Padma Shri in medicine
1928 births
Indian cardiologists
Indian medical writers
Indian medical academics
Indian medical researchers
2000 deaths
20th-century Indian medical doctors
People from Sargodha
Medical doctors from Punjab, India
Academic staff of the Postgraduate Institute of Medical Education and Research